Miss Universe Ethiopia is a beauty pageant that was first held in 2004. It is the national contest to choose the representative for the Miss Universe pageant.

History 
In 2004, The Ethiopian Life Foundation and Andy Abulime the National Director and CEO became the franchise holder, and has been since 2004, when Ethiopia made its first appearance at Miss Universe 2004 in Ecuador.

Dina Fekadu was crowned in Addis Ababa, capital of Ethiopia, on April 14, 2006. She was in the Top 20 at Miss Universe 2006 in the United States.

In 2007, The Ethiopian Life Foundation remained at the forefront of Beauty pageant development in Ethiopia, and has also since gone on to organise the first-ever International beauty pageant in Ethiopia in October 2007, Miss Tourism of the Millennium. 

In 2017 Maria Sarungi Tsehai in partnership with former Miss Universe Tanzania Nelly Kamwelu, were awarded the Miss Universe franchise in Ethiopia.

Titleholders

The Miss Universe Ethiopia has started to send a Miss Universe Ethiopia to Miss Universe from 2004. On occasion, when the winner does not qualify (due to age) for either contest, a runner-up is sent.

References

External links 
 Ethiopia Miss Universe
 www.missuniverse.com

Miss Universe by country
Beauty pageants in Ethiopia
Recurring events established in 2004
2004 establishments in Ethiopia
Ethiopian awards